Sullana is the capital of the Sullana Province, in the north-western coastal plains of Peru on the Chira valley.

Geography
Sullana is located at 04°53' south latitude and 80°41' west longitude, 38 km north of Piura, the capital of the region.

Climate
The province has a tropical savanna climate and an average temperature of 27 °C degrees. The minimum temperature is 16 °C and the maximum temperature is 38 °C (can go over 42 °C mark if the El Niño phenomenon is present).

The city is irrigated by the Chira River, the area around the capital city of Sullana is very fertile and there is much lush, tropical vegetation: Coconut palm trees, banana trees, paddy fields, etc. Sullana is an important commercial centre in one of Peru's major cotton-growing areas, along with the San Martín Region and the smaller Tumbes Region. A new sugar cane plantation has been planted nearby to produce maple ethanol for ethanol production.

Population
Migration to Sullana has been intensive, but "pueblos jóvenes" (shanty towns) are neither widespread nor conspicuous, as they are in Piura for example. The population in Sullana was 112,770 in 1981, 147,361 in 1993 and c. 162,500 in 2005.

History
The Chira valley has always been an important farming area. Before the Spanish Invasion, ethnic groups like the Tallanes, the Mochicas, the Chimú, and finally the Incas had settled here. This region was chosen by the Spaniards to found their first city in this part of the Americas, San Miguel de Tangarara, on July 15, 1532. The Spaniards changed the native farming system and created Repartimientos and Encomiendas.

Sullana was founded late in the 18th century, on July 8, 1783, by Bishop Baltazar Jaime Martínez de Compañon y Bufanda and given the name of "El Principe" (The Prince).

Transportation 
Sullana has good bus connections to the north, to Piura in the south, as well as inland to Ayabaca and to La Tina on the Ecuadorian border. The Canal Vía runs across the city.

The Tren de la Costa is planned.

Tourism 
In the first week of January the Feria Internacional de los Reyes is celebrated. 
The Poechos Reservoir, 27 km from the city, offers water sports like water skiing, motor-boating, fishing and swimming.

References

External links 

Populated places in the Piura Region
Cities in Peru